Juan Carlos Colmán (15 December 1922 – 21 September 1999) was an Argentine footballer. He played in 13 matches for the Argentina national football team from 1947 to 1956. He was also part of Argentina's squad for the 1947 South American Championship.

References

External links
 

1922 births
1999 deaths
Argentine footballers
Argentina international footballers
Place of birth missing
Association football defenders
People from Concordia, Entre Ríos
Boca Juniors footballers
Newell's Old Boys footballers
Sportspeople from Entre Ríos Province
Club Atlético Atlanta footballers
Sportivo Dock Sud players